"Summer Bunnies" is a song written, produced and performed by American R&B musician R. Kelly. The song reached #55 on the Billboard Hot 100,  #23 on the UK Top 40 and #20 on the US R&B chart.
The song heavily samples the 1982 Gap Band song "Outstanding". The remix of the song which featured his protégé Aaliyah, sampled the 1970 The Spinners' hit "It's a Shame".

Music video
The music video was shot for the remix featuring Aaliyah (Summer Bunnies Contest remix), as opposed to the album version.

Charts

References

1994 singles
R. Kelly songs
Aaliyah songs
1993 songs
Songs written by R. Kelly
Song recordings produced by R. Kelly
Jive Records singles